Feliu Formosa Torres (born 10 September 1934 in Sabadell, Catalonia, Spain) is a Spanish dramatist, poet and translator from Catalonia. He has served as dean of Institució de les Lletres Catalanes.

He translated dramatic works by Bertolt Brecht, Ernst Toller, Tankred Dorst, Anton Chekhov, Henrik Ibsen, August Strindberg, Thomas Bernhard, Friedrich Dürrenmatt, Friedrich Schiller, Botho Strauss; poetry by Georg Trakl, Goethe and François Villon; narrative by Thomas Mann, Hermann Hesse, Robert Musil, Heinrich Böll, Franz Kafka, Joseph Roth or Heinrich von Kleist; and essays by Lessing and Peter Weiss.

During his career has received several awards, like Carles Riba Award of poetry for Llibre dels viatges (1972), the Crítica Serra d'Or Award of memories for El present vulnerable (1980), the Ciutat de Palma-Joan Alcover Award for Amb effecte (1986), the Lletra d'Or Award for Semblança (1987), the Premi d'Honor de les Lletres Catalanes (Catalan Letters Lifetime Achievement Award) (2005).

In 1987 was awarded with the Creu de Sant Jordi and in 2007 with the National Theatre Award, both by the Catalan Government.

Published works

Poetry
1973: Albes breus a les mans. Barcelona: Proa
1973: Llibre de les meditacions. Barcelona: Ed. 62
1975: Raval. Barcelona: Ed. 62
1976: Cançoner. Barcelona: Vosgos
1978: Llibre dels viatges. Barcelona: Proa
1980: Si tot és dintre. Barcelona: Grijalbo
1986: Semblança. Barcelona: El Mall
1987: Amb effecte (amb Joan Casas). Barcelona: Empúries
1989: Pols al retrovisor (amb Joan Casas). València: Eliseu Climent / 3i4
1991: La campana de vidre. Barcelona: Cafè Central
1992: Impasse. Barcelona: Eumo - Cafè Central
1992: Per Puck. Barcelona: Columna
1994: Al llarg de tota una impaciència. Barcelona: Ed. 62
2000: Immediacions. Barcelona: Ed. 62 - Empúries
2001: Cap claredat no dorm. Lleida: Pagès
2004: Darrere el vidre. Poesia 1972-2002. Barcelona: Ed. 62 - Empúries
2006: Centre de brevetat. Barcelona: Meteora

Theatre
1968: L'encens i la carn. Barcelona: Ed. 62
1970: Cel.la 44. Palma de Mallorca: Daedalus
1998: El miracle de la vaca cega. Lleida: Pagès

Autobiography
1979: El present vulnerable. Barcelona: Laia
2005: A contratemps. Catarroja: Perifèric
2005: El somriure de l'atzar: Diaris II. Catarroja: Perifèric

Essay
1970: Per una acció teatral. Barcelona: Ed. 62

Narrative
1996: Les nits del Llamp. Barcelona: La Magrana

Awards
In 1997 he was awarded the Premio Nacional a la Obra de un Traductor.

External links
 Info at Associació d'Escriptors en Llengua Catalana 
 Feliu Formosa at LletrA, Catalan Literature Online (Open University of Catalonia).

1934 births
Living people
Catalan dramatists and playwrights
Poets from Catalonia
German–Spanish translators
German–Catalan translators
Translators from Catalonia
Premi d'Honor de les Lletres Catalanes winners
Spanish male poets
Male dramatists and playwrights